The  Washington Redskins season was the franchise's 50th season in the National Football League (NFL) and their 44th in Washington, D.C. The team improved on their 6–10 record from 1980 and finished with an 8–8 record, but missed the playoffs for the fifth consecutive season. This was Joe Gibbs' first season as head coach. The team slumped early, losing its first 5 games before upsetting the Chicago Bears 24-7 in Chicago before losing to the Dolphins to sit at 1-6. The Redskins would do better in the second half, as they would win their next 4 games to sit at 5-6 and looking like they were going to reach the playoffs. However, losses to the Dallas Cowboys and Buffalo Bills eliminated the Redskins from any hopes at reaching the playoffs. The team would win its final 3 games of the season to end the season 8-8.  Among these three wins was a close victory at RFK Stadium against the defending Super Bowl finalist Eagles, 15-13.

Offseason

NFL draft

Personnel

Staff

Roster

Regular season

Schedule

Standings

References

External links
 1981 Washington Redskins at Pro-Football-Reference.com

Washington
Washington Redskins seasons
Wash